The Holly Street Fire Hall, at 1600 Holly St. in Nashville, Tennessee, was built in 1914.  It was listed on the National Register of Historic Places in 1914.

It is a red brick two-story fire station designed with elements of Colonial Revival and/or Classical Revival style by Nashville's first city architect James Yeaman to fit into its neighborhood, a residential area with houses having columns and porticos.

The fire hall sustained extensive damage during the Nashville 2020 Tornado which struck around 12:45 AM on March 3, 2020. The fire hall lost its roof and many windows.

References

Fire stations on the National Register of Historic Places in Tennessee
National Register of Historic Places in Davidson County, Tennessee
Colonial Revival architecture in Tennessee
Buildings and structures completed in 1914